Doris Salomo Fuakuputu (born 18 April 1984) is a Congolese footballer who plays for  Al-Ahli Manama in Bahrain.

He became the second player to play for both Kuwaiti giants.

Honours

Al Fateh
 Saudi Premier League : 2012-13
 Saudi Super Cup : 2013

References

External links
 
 Saudi League stats at slstat.com
 

1984 births
Living people
Footballers from Kinshasa
Democratic Republic of the Congo footballers
Democratic Republic of the Congo international footballers
Democratic Republic of the Congo expatriate footballers
Democratic Republic of the Congo expatriate sportspeople in Italy
Expatriate footballers in Saudi Arabia
Al-Fateh SC players
Como 1907 players
Avezzano Calcio players
Qadsia SC players
Expatriate footballers in Bahrain
Expatriate footballers in Kuwait
Saudi Professional League players
Association football forwards
Expatriate footballers in Italy
21st-century Democratic Republic of the Congo people